The NSPCL Bhilai Power Plant is a coal-fired captive power station at Bhilai in Durg district, Chhattisgarh, India. The power station owned and operated by NSPCL is a 50:50 joint venture company of NTPC Limited and SAIL to generate power for captive purposes of various steel plants owned by SAIL.

Capacity
The project comprises two power plants named Bhilai Captive Power Plant a 74 MW (2x30 MW and 1x14 MW)  and a new Bhilai Expansion Power Project a 500 MW (2x250 MW)  The power left available after captive purposes is provided to other users in the Western region.

References

Coal-fired power stations in Chhattisgarh
Buildings and structures in Bhilai
Year of establishment missing